Obel may refer to:

People with the surname
Onegi Obel (1932–2008), Ugandan economist and politician and former adviser to the President of Uganda
Geoffrey Onegi Obel, Ugandan economist and politician
Agnes Obel, Danish singer/songwriter
Henrik Frode Obel (1942–2014), Danish businessman, after whom the Obel Award for architecture is named

Others uses
10057 L'Obel, a main-belt asteroid
Obel River, a small tributary to the Mareb River whose headwaters are in the Eritrean Highlands on the border between Eritrea and Ethiopia
Obel Tower, a building in Belfast, Northern Ireland